The Painted Smile is a 1962 British thriller film directed by Lance Comfort and starring Liz Fraser, Kenneth Griffith, Peter Reynolds and Tony Wickert. The film was known in the USA as Murder Can Be Deadly.

Plot
Tom, a student, comes under suspicion of murder when he discovers a dead body in the flat of con artist Jo. After he touches the murder weapon, Jo convinces him it is in his interest to dispose of the body. The victim was Jo's partner in crime who has been murdered by a Soho gang boss. However, the suspicions of the police are aroused and Tom becomes the obvious suspect.

Cast
 Liz Fraser - Jo Lake
 Kenneth Griffith - Kleinie
 Peter Reynolds - Mark
 Tony Wickert - Tom
 Craig Douglas - Nightclub Singer
 Nanette Newman - Mary
 Ray Smith - Glynn
 David Hemmings - Roy
 Harold Berens - Mikhala
 Grazina Frame - Lucy
 Richard McNeff - Police Inspector
 Gerald Sim - Plain Clothes Policeman
 Rosemary Chalmers - Gloria
 Mia Karam - Dawn
 Terence Maidment - Henchman
 Bill Stevens - Henchman
 Lionel Ngakane - Barman
 Ann Wrigg - Manageress

Critical reception
The Radio Times wrote, "this dreadfully dull British B-movie makes its brief running time seem like an eternity"; while Cinedelica called the film "engaging and without a dull moment. Good stuff."

References

External links

1962 films
1960s thriller films
British black-and-white films
British thriller films
Films directed by Lance Comfort
Films set in London
Films shot at Shepperton Studios
Films with screenplays by Pip and Jane Baker
1960s English-language films
1960s British films